Hippea  is an obligate anaerobic and moderately thermophilic bacteria genus from the family of Desulfobacteraceae. Hippea is named after the German microbiologist Hans Hippe.

References

Further reading 
 
 

 

Campylobacterota
Bacteria genera